Stockdale is a borough in Washington County, Pennsylvania, United States. The population was 424 at the 2020 census.

Geography
Stockdale is located at  (40.083348, -79.850456).

Surrounding neighborhoods
Stockdale's only land border is with Allenport.  Across the Monongahela River to the south in Fayette County, Stockdale runs adjacent with Jefferson Township.

Demographics

At the 2000 census there were 555 people, 251 households, and 167 families living in the borough. The population density was 2,091.2 people per square mile (793.7/km2). There were 267 housing units at an average density of 1,006.0 per square mile (381.8/km2).  The racial makeup of the borough was 98.74% White, 0.72% African American, 0.18% Asian, and 0.36% from two or more races. Hispanic or Latino of any race were 0.18%.

Of the 251 households 22.7% had children under the age of 18 living with them, 51.4% were married couples living together, 9.6% had a female householder with no husband present, and 33.1% were non-families. 29.5% of households were one person and 13.1% were one person aged 65 or older. The average household size was 2.21 and the average family size was 2.72.

The age distribution was 16.9% under the age of 18, 7.4% from 18 to 24, 27.4% from 25 to 44, 26.7% from 45 to 64, and 21.6% 65 or older. The median age was 44 years. For every 100 females, there were 94.7 males. For every 100 females age 18 and over, there were 96.2 males.

The median household income was $30,000 and the median family income  was $33,750. Males had a median income of $30,781 versus $25,000 for females. The per capita income for the borough was $19,470. About 13.6% of families and 14.1% of the population were below the poverty line, including 16.7% of those under age 18 and 12.5% of those age 65 or over.

References

Boroughs in Washington County, Pennsylvania
Populated places established in 1891
Pittsburgh metropolitan area
Pennsylvania populated places on the Monongahela River
1891 establishments in Pennsylvania